Chris Claybrooks (born July 17, 1998) is an American football cornerback for the Jacksonville Jaguars of the National Football League (NFL). He played college football at Memphis.

College career
Claybrooks played wide receiver at Coahoma Community College but switched to cornerback when he transferred to Memphis. Claybrooks missed five games in 2018 with a foot injury. In 2019, he posted 42 tackles and returned a kickoff for a touchdown. In the AAC Championship game against Cincinnati, he had an interception and forced a fumble.

Professional career

Claybrooks was selected in the seventh round of the 2020 NFL Draft by the Jacksonville Jaguars with the 223rd overall pick. He was placed on injured reserve on November 26, 2020. On December 19, 2020, Claybrooks was activated off of injured reserve.

References

External links
Jacksonville Jaguars bio

1998 births
Living people
Players of American football from Nashville, Tennessee
American football cornerbacks
Memphis Tigers football players
Jacksonville Jaguars players